Kizuna (foaled 5 March 2010) is a Japanese Thoroughbred racehorse.

Background
Kizuna is a brown horse with a small white star and white socks on his hind legs, bred in Japan by the North Hills Co Ltd. He was sired by the outstanding Japanese racehorse Deep Impact out of the Canadian-bred mare Catequil. Deep Impact was the Japanese Horse of the Year in 2005 and 2006, winning races including the Tokyo Yushun, Tenno Sho, Arima Kinen and Japan Cup. Catequil had previously produced the Japanese champion filly Phalaenopsis. She was also a half-sister of Pacificus, the dam of Narita Brian and Biwa Hayahide, both of whom were named Japanese Horse of the Year.

Koji Maeda, head of North Hills, named the horse Kizuna, which is a Japanese word meaning "bond", after he was touched by the warm words he was given by others around him when he was visiting Dubai for the 2011 Dubai World Cup that was held two weeks after the 2011 Tohoku Earthquake, which coincided with Kizuna just turning 1 year old.

Racing career

2012: two-year-old season
Kizuna began his racing career on 7 October 2012 when he won a race for newcomers over 1800 metres at Kyoto Racecourse. He won another race over the same course and distance on 11 November. The colt was then moved up in class for the Grade 3 Radio Nikkei Hai Nisai Stake over 2000 metres at Hanshin Racecourse, where he finished third, beaten half a length and a neck by Epiphaneia and Bad Boy.

2013: three-year-old season
Kizuna made his three-year-old debut in the Grade 2 Hochi Hai Yayoi Sho at Nakayama Racecourse on 3 March. In a blanket finish, he took fifth place in a field of twelve runners, less than three-quarters of a length behind the winner Camino Tassajara. Three weeks later, Kizuna started the 1/2 favourite for the Grade 3 Mainichi Hai at Hanshin. Ridden by Yutaka Take, he won by three lengths from Geyersworth, with Bad Boy three and a half lengths back in third. Despite being eligible the Satsuki Sho, the first leg of Japanese Triple Crown, Kizuna's connection decided not to field him in the race, but to focus on the Tokyo Yūshun, the Japanese derby.

On 4 May Kizuna entered one of the preparation races, the Kyoto Shimbun Hai over 2200 metres at Kyoto. He started the 2/5 favourite and won by one and a half lengths from Peptide Amazon. Kizuna was one of eighteen colts to contest the 80th running of the Tokyo Yūshun at Tokyo Racecourse and started the 19/10 favourite ahead of the Satsuki Sho winner Logotype. Take produced the colt with a strong late run on the outside to take the lead in the final strides and win by half a length from Epiphaneia in a time of 2:24.6.

Kizuna was sent to Europe in the autumn of 2013 to be prepared for a run the Prix de l'Arc de Triomphe. On 15 September he contested the Prix Niel at Longchamp Racecourse in Paris where he faced a strong field of European colts including The Derby winner Ruler of the World and the Grand Prix de Paris winner Flintshire. Take restrained the colt towards the back of the field before making his challenge on the outside in the straight. He took the lead inside the last 100 metres and held off the late challenge of Ruler of the World to win by a head. After the race Kizuna's trainer Shozo Sasaki said "This was his first run abroad so I'm very pleased. He was about 80% compared with the Japanese Derby, so we will work hard to get the final 20% before the Arc." On 6 October started the third favourite in a field of seventeen runners in the Arc de Triomphe. Date held the colt up at the back of the field before moving up on the outside approaching the turn into the straight. He stayed on well in the closing stages to finish fourth behind Treve, Orfevre and Intello.

In January 2014 Kizuna won the JRA Award for Best Three-Year-Old Colt taking 238 of the 280 votes.

2014: four-year-old season
Kizuna began his third season with an easy win in the Grade 2 Sankei Osaka Hai at Hanshin on 6 April. On 4 May Kizuna started 7/10 favourite for the two-mile Tenno Sho at Kyoto. He was held up at the back of the eighteen runner field before switching to the wide outside in the straight. He finished strongly, but was unable to catch the leaders and finished fourth behind Fenomeno, Win Variation and Hokko Brave. Shortly after the race, it was announced that Kizuna had sustained a small fracture to his left hind leg and would be off the track for most of the year. Sasaki suggested that his next run might be the Arima Kinen in December.

2015: five-year-old season
After a nine-month absence, Kizuna returned in the Grade 2 Kyoto Kinen on 15 February 2015 and finished third, beaten a nose and a neck by Lovely Day and Suzuka Devious with Harp Star in fifth. In April he started odds-on favourite for the Sankei Osaka Hai but was beaten into second place by the five-year-old mare Lachesis. On 3 May Kizuna was made the 2.3/1 favourite for the Tennō Shō but finished seventh of the seventeen runners behind Gold Ship. He was retired from racing after sustaining a training injury in September 2015.

Stud career

Kizuna was retired to the Shadai Stallion Station and has a service fee of ¥12,000,000.

Notable progeny

c = colt, f = filly, g = gelding

Pedigree

References

2010 racehorse births
Racehorses bred in Japan
Racehorses trained in Japan
Thoroughbred family 13-a